Nikolai Shin (1928 in Dalnegorsk, Primorsky Krai, Soviet Union – August 18, 2006 in Tashkent, Uzbekistan) was an Uzbekistani painter of Korean descent, sometimes referred to by Korean newspapers as the "Picasso of Asia".

Biography

Early life 
Shin's childhood was filled with hardships. His father died at the age of 21, when Shin was only 4; his mother remarried the following year, sending him and his sister to live with their grandmother. In 1937, he and his family were deported to Central Asia along with all other ethnic Koreans in the Russian Far East. After the deportations, his family stayed in the Kazakh SSR for a few years before eventually settling in Tashkent, Uzbek SSR (now Uzbekistan) in 1940. His sister became infected with malaria and died at the age of 16, leaving Shin as sole breadwinner for his mother and grandmother; Shin spoke of his memories of tilling the rocky soil with his bare hands, trying to eke out a living. Eventually, unable to care for his grandmother, he sent her to live with relatives in the Kazakh SSR, where she too died.

Artistic career 

In 1949, Shin graduated from Tashkent's Benkov Art School, and began his career in painting, first receiving acclaim for his work in 1957, when he won the grand prize at the International Youth Festival in Moscow and the second prize in the Republican Festival of Young Artists of Uzbekistan. In 1960, he graduated from Atropsky Art College, also in Tashkent; after his graduation, he began work on his painting Requiem, which would take him until 1982 to complete. Requiem, painted on a canvas three metres tall and forty-four metres wide in primary colors, depicts people without eyes, noses, or mouths; Shin has stated that this was meant to represent the sense of enslavement and namelessness felt by the Koryo-saram as a result of the deportations. Following his completion of Requiem, Shin would go on to paint other works on the theme of the deportations and of Korean culture in Central Asia;  he began to become well known in the West with his solo exhibition in Moscow in 1990, and another in Tashkent in 1991. Eventually, his art attracted the attention of the Central Asian-American Enterprise Fund, who offered him financial support, enabling him to hold further exhibitions. His work was recognised by the Korean government in 1997, when they awarded him with the Order of Culture Merit (문화훈장); he then donated Requiem to the Museum of Contemporary Art.

Aside from his own artwork, Shin also took up a teaching post at his alma mater, the Benkov Art School, despite the low salary; he became a mentor to his student Elena Lee, another Uzbekistani painter of Korean descent, whose work was featured in 2004 at an exhibition in Almaty, Kazakhstan. He died August 18, 2006, in Tashkent, Uzbekistan. He is survived by a wife and three sons.

Documentary 

In 2001, Shin's life story was made into a documentary film Sky-Blue Hometown, directed by Kim So-young. Kim stated that she was inspired to tell Shin's story after seeing Requiem displayed at the National Museum of Contemporary Art and reading articles in the domestic press about Koreans in Uzbekistan. Through the film, she hoped "to convey the earnest wishes and lost dreams of the victims, rather than render a bleak ambiance of the hurt and resentment endured by Koreans as a minority race in the former Soviet Union and Central Asia at the present time." After completing the film, she was disappointed by the initial lack of domestic interest; though it won grand prize at the Seoul International Documentary and Film Festival and was honoured as the best Korean documentary at the Pusan International Film Festival, local distributors remained uninterested in the film. Sky-Blue Hometown would go on to be invited to several international film festivals in 2001, including the Asian American International Film Festival in New York, the Yamagata International Documentary Film Festival in Japan, the International Documentary Film Festival Amsterdam, and the International Festival of Audio-visual Programs in Paris. In November of the following year, it won the Network for the Promotion of Asian Cinema prize at the Taiwan International Documentary Festival. However, it was not shown in cinemas in Korea until 2003.

Credits 
 Director: Kim So-young
 Production: Cine-Maya
 Screenplay: Kim So-young
 Photography: Nikolay Gerasimov
 Editing: Kim So-young
 Sound: Won-jong Soh
 Music: Duck Hyun, Jun-sung Kim, Young-jo Lee
 World Sales: Cine-Maya
 Screening copy: Korean Film Commission

Works

Exhibitions 
 1990: Trechakopskaya Art Gallery, Moscow
 1991: National Museum of Art, Tashkent
 1995: National Museum of Art, Tashkent
 1997: Korean National Museum of Contemporary Art, Seoul
 2006: Korean Culture Day, Tashkent

Paintings

References

External links 
 Sky-Blue Hometown
 Online gallery of Shin's work hosted by the Chosun Ilbo

Soviet painters
Koryo-saram
1928 births
2006 deaths
20th-century Uzbekistani painters
Soviet people of Korean descent
Uzbekistani people of Korean descent